Emília Vášáryová, Doctor Artis Dramaticae (hon.) (born 18 May 1942) is a Slovak stage and screen actress, referred to as the "First Lady of Slovak Theater". During her over five decades long career, she has received numerous awards including the Meritorious Artist (1978), Alfréd Radok Award (1996), Czech Lion Award Golden Goblet Award (2008), and most recently the honorary degree Doctor Artis Dramaticae Honoris Causa (2010) as the only female to date, and ELSA (2010). While her sister is former diplomat Magdaléna Vášáryová, Czech media regards her as an "Honorary Consul of Czech and Slovak Relations".

Biography

Early years

Vášáryová was born in Horná Štubňa, the First Slovak Republic. However, and along with younger sister Magdaléna (who became a popular actress herself), she was raised in Banská Štiavnica, where both their parents taught. Her father, József Vásáry (member of the Hungarian noble Vásáry family), taught Slovak literature and grammar at gymnasium, and mother Hermína German language.

Since childhood, Vášáryová played amateur theater, as well as participated in gymnastics. While at JSŠ highschool in Štiavnica, she was chosen for a cameo role in the Slovak/Hungarian film St. Peter's Umbrella. She played a servant-girl with only one line "I'm coming, I'm coming!". The color motion picture was released in both regions at the Christmas 1958 with her name not credited.

1960s
Although decided to proceed with languages study, or history of art at university, due to lacking so-called "confidential files" (issued by Communist Party of Czechoslovakia), Vášáryová continues at Academy of Performing Arts in Bratislava with theater, eventually.

When at college, she receives a few of supporting roles in two black-and-white films. Marching Is Not Always Fun (1960) and Midnight Mass (1962). In Young Ages (1962) she showed up for the first time on television. Her breakthrough came with a lead role (as "Diana") in Vojtěch Jasný's The Cassandra Cat, in which a magic cat reveals the true nature of everyone he looks at. The film premiered at the Canness in May 1963, scoring two major awards in France. C.S.T. Prize and Special Jury. Cassandra Cat won a number of awards at various international festivals in Spain, Greece, Colombia and Italy.

In December 1963, A Face at the Window (directed by Peter Solan) is opened with Ladislav Chudík and Štefan Kvietik in the leads, of which both will have a significant impact on the Vášáryová's career. Chudík in onstage terms next year, while Kvietik as her frequent "husband" in many a film. 

In 1964, following an offer from drama chief Ladislav Chudík, Vášáryová joined the ensemble of the Slovak National Theatre on 1 August, despite noticed frustration from senior actors to whom she appeared too young and inexperienced for the stage of first order. Prior to that, she spent one season at New Scene, having appeared in four productions in total due to Magda Husáková-Lokvencová, the first spouse of the final President of Czechoslovakia, Gustáv Husák.

Her debut at the national playhouse was as Ophelia in a production of Hamlet. For Shakespeare's Helena in A Midsummer Night's Dream, and Lope de Vega's Florelle in the comedy The Dancing Master, she received the Janko Borodáč Award in 1967.

On film, the actress appeared in A Jester's Tale, which brought Karel Zeman two awards at the San Francisco IFF '64 (for Best Film and Best Direction), and the first prize at Addis Ababa IFF '64 in Ethiopia.

Other full-length films included St. Elizabeth Square (1965), Master Executioner (1966), Trailer People (1966), The Dragon's Return (1967) and There's No Other Way (1968). Simultaneously, Vášáryová began a television career, winning in Brno the first edition of the TV national contest Golden Croc in 1968 as the Most Popular Actress '67.

1970s
Along with acting onstage (in Herodes and Herodias by Pavol Országh Hviezdoslav, Gorky's Vassa Zheleznova and The Last Ones, Palárik's Thanksgiving Adventure, Sophocles's Antigone and Tolstoy–Piscator's War and Peace), Vášáryová developed her television career, with roles in The Balade for the Seven Hanged (1968), Parisian Mohicans (1971), Noodledom (1971), The Shepherd Wife (1972), Monna Vanna (1973), and Impatient Heart (1974; in which her sister Magda co-starred). She was cast in several films. Copper Tower, directed by Martin Hollý Jr. (who collaborated with Vášáryová in The Balade for the Seven Hanged), which earned a Special Prize at the 21st Film Festival of Proletariats (FFP) in 1970. Martin Ťapák's The Day Which Does Not Die received various domestic awards for director and lead male (actor Štefan Kvietik). 

The second half of the 70s became a very successful season for the artist, whose work was appreciated in film, and that much in theater. As "Zuza" in Who Leaves in the Rain (directed by Hollý Jr), Vášáryová received in Prague ZČDU Award at the 13th Festival of Czechoslovak Film (FČSF) as Best Actress in 1975.

Red Wine by Andrej Lettrich, who received the State Prize of Klement Gottwald for the direction, gained her much popularity on the screen, as well as on television (where the drama was split in two-episode TV series). The Lawyer, also the Lettrich's picture, won the Best Film award at the 16th Festival of Czechoslovak Film (FČSF) in České Budějovice in 1978, and brought Vášáryová herself her second ZČDU Award at the 21st Karlovy Vary International Film Festival (1978) in Karlovy Vary, and in common with the ÚV SZŽ Gold Plaque. She was also awarded the honorary title of Meritorious Artist.

1980s

The 1980s were not significant years, although she appeared in more than 30 television movies. Her film career stalled after she reached her forties. The only two pictures she co-starred in were fairy-tale Plavčík and Vratko (1981), directed by Martin Ťapák as their third collaboration (the earlier films featured Journey to San Jago and the Day Which Does Not Die), and About Fame and Grass, a short story by Peter Solan (1984). Costume designer of both movies was Vášáryová's second husband, Milan Čorba. 

She began to focus solely on her stage career. She played the lead role in Iphigenia in Tauris. At the end of the decade, Vášáryová began lecturing theater at the Academy of Performing Arts in Bratislava. (One of her former students was also Barbora Bobuľová, who later achieved an international career, including David di Donatello and Nastro d'Argento award).

1990s
Following the prize for her lifetime contribution, delivered by Ministry of Culture in 1991, Vášáryová launched the fourth decade of her active playing in TV. Amongst other sixteen pieces the actress made for TV in nineties, Vášáryová was also given (as opposite to Martin Huba) the lead female part in Marguerite Duras'es play La Musica, for which she won in 1992 a Telemuse Award as Best TV Actress. At the same time, and almost eight years since her last appearance onscreen, the actress returned to films as "Silvia" in Red Gypsy (1992), directed by Branislav Mišík. She was cast in Hazard (1995), Roman Petrenko's debut, based on a true story, in which she co-starred with Marek Vašut.
Tomáš Krnáč assigned Vášáryová in the short film, The Higher Power (1996), in the role of a diva diagnosed with a serious illness.
In theater, she was acclaimed for her performance as "the Younger Sister" in Thomas Bernhard's play Ritter, Dene, Voss, presented at the Divadlo na Zábradlí Theatre in Prague in 1996. This play was also awarded as the best play of the 1996.

Since the second half of the nineties, fifty years old Vášáryová successfully rebuilt her legend on the screen, as a result of new challenging roles the actress was to receive. Following The Cage, she left television for almost a decade. She appeared in Martin Šulík's Orbis Pictus, which was lauded at the International Filmfestival Mannheim-Heidelberg, Vášáryová was given the role of mother. So was in Eva Borušovičová's official debut Blue Heaven (1997) that received nominations on several festivals, including at the 32nd Karlovy Vary IFF or at the independent Cinequest Film Festival held annually in San Jose, California. Return to Paradise Lost by Vojtěch Jasný was a Montréal WFF nominee, her next picture Cosy Dens (1999) was a comedy, directed by Jan Hřebejk. and Vášáryová would become more importantly the director's protégé also in the 2000s. For her stage performances, for the role of Agnes in the Edward Albee play, A Delicate Balance she received the Crystal Wing in 1999 as Best Artist in Theater/Film. As the Old Woman in Ionesco's absurdist tragedy The Chairs, she received the Dosky Award, Jozef Kroner Award and Literature Fund award (all 2000).

2000s

In 2001, Vášáryová won a national journalist pool, being rated as the "Actress of the Century" in her native country. Among more than ten stage roles she studied for her home stage during this period, she performed Maria Callas in McNally's Master Class, for which she was awarded by both DOSKY and LitFond Awards in 2002. In 2009, she played the main role in Mother Courage and Her Children by Brecht and Desseau, and in 2011 she was cast as Violet Weston in Tracy Letts' August: Lost in Oklahoma. For the role of Stevie Gray in Edward Albee's The Goat, or Who Is Sylvia? she received DOSKY award in 2004. She also appeared in other local theatres, such as L&S Studio (Three Versions of Life in 2003, or Kingfisher in 2009) and GUnaGU Theater (Turn-away Side of the Moon in 2015). Apart from that, she has been featured in a number of Prague's productions, particularly for Studio DVA.

On TV, her later titles included a soap-opera The Consulting Room at Pink Garden (2007) and series The Old Town's Crime Stories (2010), and a Czech TV movie Picnic directed by Hynek Bočan (2014).

Notes
  The original show ran until 1989. Though a similar pool 'Television Bells' also ran in the Czechoslovakia since 1985. In 1990 Golden Croc was replaced by I Like (that lasts the only year actually), and starting 1991  Awards is effective in the Czech Republic. In Slovakia, the OTO Awards were founded in 2000.

Filmography

Awards

Notes
 A  Won by Lenka Termerová for her role of Mother in Děti noci directed by Michaela Pavlátová.
 B  Won by Zdena Studenková. Vášáryová was ranked as the third, following Anna Šišková.
 C  Won by Zdena Studenková. Vášáryová was ranked as the third, following Kamila Magálová.
 D  Won by Zdena Studenková. Vášáryová was ranked as the second, followed by Kamila Magálová.
 E  Won by Zdena Studenková. Vášáryová was ranked as the third, following Magda Paveleková.
 F  Won by Petra Polnišová. Vášáryová was ranked as the third, following Gabriela Dzúriková.

References
General
 
  
  
Specific

Further reading

External links

 
 
 Emília Vášáryová's gallery by MF DNES
 Photos of Vášáryová photos, Kinobox.cx; accessed 10 May 2014.

1942 births
Living people
People from Turčianske Teplice District
Slovak stage actresses
Slovak film actresses
Slovak television actresses
Recipients of Medal of Merit (Czech Republic)
20th-century Slovak actresses
21st-century Slovak actresses
Sun in a Net Awards winners
Czech Lion Awards winners
Order of Ľudovít Štúr